J. H. Lambert may refer to:

Johann Heinrich Lambert (1728–1777), Swiss mathematician, physicist and astronomer
Joseph Hamilton Lambert (1825–1909), American orchardist and developer of the Lambert cherry

See also
Lambert (surname)